Swords Against Darkness is an anthology of fantasy stories, edited by Andrew J. Offutt. It was first published in paperback by Zebra Books in February 1977.

Summary
The book collects nine short stories and novelettes by various fantasy authors, with a foreword by Offutt. It is the first in a series of five anthologies by the same name.

Contents
"Foreword" (Andrew J. Offutt)
"Nekht Semerkeht" (Robert E. Howard and Andrew J. Offutt) 
"The Tale of Hauk" (Poul Anderson) 
"The Smile of Oisia" (George W. Proctor)
"Pride of the Fleet" (Bruce Jones) 
"Straggler from Atlantis" (Manly Wade Wellman) 
"The Ring of Set" (Richard L. Tierney) 
"Largarut's Bane" (Raul Garcia Capella) 
"Dragons' Teeth" (David Drake)
"The Sustenance of Hoak" (Ramsey Campbell)

External links
ISFD entry for Swords Against Darkness

1977 anthologies
Fantasy anthologies
Sword and sorcery anthology series
Heroic fantasy
Zebra Books books